The 1848 United States presidential election in Louisiana took place on November 7, 1848, as part of the 1848 United States presidential election. Voters chose six representatives, or electors to the Electoral College, who voted for President and Vice President.

Louisiana voted for the Whig candidate, Zachary Taylor, over Democratic candidate Lewis Cass. Taylor won Louisiana by a margin of 9.18%.

Results

See also
 United States presidential elections in Louisiana

References

Louisiana
1848
1848 Louisiana elections